Thomas Heose (died after 1414) was the member of the Parliament of England for Marlborough for the parliament of 1406.

He was the mayor of Marlborough in 1402–03.

References 

Members of Parliament for Marlborough
English MPs 1406
Mayors of Marlborough
Year of birth unknown
Year of death unknown